Boomer's Adventure in ASMIK World, known in Japan as  is a Game Boy video game from Asmik copyrighted in 1989; Asmik of America Corp. copyrighted its version in 1990. The game's direct sequel, Asmik-kun World 2, was never released outside Japan. The game is an example of the "trap-em-up" genre, which also includes games like Heiankyo Alien (1979), Space Panic (1980), and Lode Runner (1983).

This video game stars Boomer (Asmik-kun in the Japanese version), a pink dinosaur, coursing through maze-like levels through a large tower. Boomer traps enemies by digging holes and letting the enemy fall in them. Boomer can also dig out items and keys needed to complete the levels. Passwords are revealed before and after every boss level, every eight levels.

The game boasts 64 levels but actually only features 32 levels, played twice. Once the player reaches the top of the tower and defeats the master villain of the game, one must then descend the tower, playing through the previous 32 levels in reverse, complete with fighting the previous bosses one more time.

Reception

References

External links

  Moby Games screenshots
 Boomer's Adventure in ASMIK World at GameFAQs
 Boomer's Adventure in ASMIK World at GB no Game Seiha Shimasho

1989 video games
Asmik Ace Entertainment games
Dinosaurs in video games
Game Boy-only games
Maze games
Puzzle video games
Video games developed in Japan
Video games scored by Atsuhiro Motoyama
Game Boy games